Pradosia subverticillata is a species of plant in the family Sapotaceae. It is endemic to Brazil and threatened by habitat loss.

References

Flora of Brazil
subverticillata
Vulnerable plants
Taxonomy articles created by Polbot
Taxa named by Adolpho Ducke